Viscount Antoine Henri Philippe Léon Cartier d'Aure (2 June 1799 – 6 April 1863) was a French riding-master, and author of important treatises on dressage. He was écuyer en chef of the Cadre Noir of Saumur, and later to the Emperor of France, Napoléon III. He was made an officer of the Légion d'Honneur in 1849.

Life 
Cartier d'Aure was born on 2 June 1799 (15 Prairial VII according to the Republican calendar then in use) in Toulouse, in the Haute-Garonne in south-west France, the posthumous son of Antoine Cartier d'Aure of Pointis-de-Rivière and Rose-Claire Barthélémie de Foucaud, who was from the Languedoc. In 1815 he left the academy of Saint-Cyr with the rank of sous-lieutenant. Under Louis XVIII and Charles X he was an écuyer cavalcadour. In 1823, after service in Spain, he was made a knight of the Légion d'Honneur.

From 26 February 1847 he was écuyer en chef of the École de cavalerie in Saumur. In 1849 he was promoted to officer of the Légion d'Honneur. He retired on 17 July 1854, and went to live at Tours.

In 1858 he was appointed écuyer en chef and inspector of the imperial stables to the Emperor of France, Napoléon III. From 1861 he was inspector-general of the imperial stud.

He died on 6 April 1863 at the Château de Saint-Cloud in Saint-Cloud, Hauts-de-Seine. He had married three times, to Clémence-Etienette Le Noir de Pas de Loup, to Louise Ursule Chapelles de Courteilles, and lastly to Adrienne-Olympe de Bentzon, who survived him.

Published works 
The published works of Cartier d'Aure include but probably are not limited to the following:

 Aperçu sur la situation des chevaux en France, par M. le Vte d'Aure,... 1826
 Projet relatif aux chevaux et aux écoles d'équitation, par le Vte d'Aure 1828
 Traité d'équitation, par M. le Vte d'Aure...  Paris: Mme Leclère, 1834
 Situation chevaline de la France, par le Vte d'Aure 1835
 De l'Amélioration du cheval en France 1836
 De l'industrie chevaline en France et des moyens pratiques d'en assurer la prospérité Paris: Chez Léautey et Lecointe 1840
 Observations sur la nouvelle méthode d'équitation, par M. le Vte d'Aure 1842
 Quelques Observations sur la brochure du Mis Oudinot (″Des Remontes, de leurs rapports avec l'administration des haras″), par M. le Vte d'Aure 1842	
 Réponse de M. le vicomte d'Aure a un article du Spectateur militaire du 15 janvier 1843 (signé Guillaume-Auguste D.) en faveur de la nouvelle méthode d'équitation. [Paris, Imprimerie de Ve Dondey-Dupré, 1843]
 Utilité d'une école normale d'équitation, de son influence sur l'éducation du cheval léger, sur les besoins de l'agriculture et sur les ressources qu'elle peut offrir à la classe pauvre, par M. le Vte d'Aure 1845
 Traité d'équitation illustré: précédé d'un aperçu des diverses modifications et changements apportés dans l'équitation depuis le XVIe siècle jusqu'à nos jours ... Paris: A. Leneveu, 1847. "Illustrated treatise of equitation ..." (the 3rd edition, according to Brunet)
 Des haras et de la situation chevaline en 1852 Saumur: [s.n.] 1852, "Of stud-farms and the situation of the horse in 1852"
 Cours d'équitation Paris: J. Dumaine 1853
 De la Question équestre et de Madame Isabelle à l'École de cavalerie, par le Cte d'Aure 1855
 Encore la question chevaline Paris: Dumaine 1860

References

Further reading 

 Étienne Saurel Histoire de l'Équitation, 1971. Japanese translation version of 2005.

Dressage trainers
Classical horsemanship
1799 births
1863 deaths
Writers on horsemanship